Pius Malekandathil (born 1960)  is an Indian historian and a priest of the Syro-Malabar Church. He is a professor at the Centre for Historical Studies, Jawaharlal Nehru University, New Delhi.

He is a leading expert in medieval history of India and the Saint Thomas Christians of Kerala.

Selected publications
His major works include:
The Germans, the Portuguese and India (1999)
Portuguese Cochin and the Maritime Trade of India, 1500-1663 (2001)
  Jornada of Dom Alexis de Menezes: A Portuguese Account of the Sixteenth Century Malabar (Antonio de Gouvea, translated and edited 2003)
 Maritime India: Trade, Religion and Polity, the Indian Ocean (2010); 
 The Mughals, the Portuguese and the Indian Ocean: Changing Imageries of Maritime India (2013);
 Cities in Medieval India (co-edited with Yogesh Sharma, 2014).
 Christianity in Indian History: Issues of Culture, Power, and Knowledge. (co-edited with Joy L.K. Pachuau, and Tanika Sarkar, 2016)
India, the Portuguese and maritime interactions (co-edited by Lotika Varadarajan, Amar Farooqui, 2019)

References

20th-century Indian historians
Syro-Malabar priests
Academic staff of Jawaharlal Nehru University
1960 births
Living people
21st-century Indian historians